Alfredo "Larry" Pignagnoli is an Italian producer and is behind several international dance hits. He runs the production unit Off Limits in Italy. Among the artists he has produced are:
 Whigfield
 Benny Benassi
 Annerley Gordon
 Spagna
 Benassi Bros
 Dhany
 Sandy Chambers
 In-Grid
 Fun Fun
 J.K.

References

Italian record producers
Living people
Year of birth missing (living people)